June Louise Squibb (born November 6, 1929) is an American actress. In 2013, she was nominated for the Academy Award for Best Supporting Actress for the film Nebraska.

Squibb has appeared in the films Alice, In & Out, About Schmidt, Would You Rather, I'll See You in My Dreams, Other People, Table 19, Summer '03, Blow the Man Down, Palm Springs, Hubie Halloween, Godmothered, Palmer, and The Humans. She also provided voice acting roles for the animated films Ralph Breaks the Internet, Toy Story 4 and Soul.

In television, she had recurring roles on series's Ghost Whisperer, The Young and the Restless, Shameless, Good Girls, and Little Voice.

Personal life
Squibb was born in Vandalia, Illinois. Her mother, JoyBelle, was a silent film pianist. Her father, Lewis, was an insurance agent. Squibb married Edward Sostek in 1953. They divorced in 1959. Squibb married acting teacher Charles Kakatsakis. They have a son, Harry, a filmmaker whose short film is Admissions. Squibb converted to Judaism in the 1950s. When asked about ageism in show business, she said, "Well, it's like anything else. I always feel, rules are meant to be broken."

Career

Squibb worked at The Muny and trained at HB Studio. She works at the Cleveland Play House, and starred in productions of Marseilles, The Play's the Thing, Goodbye, My Fancy, The Heiress, Detective Story, Antigone, Ladies in Retirement and Bloomer Girl. She played Dulcie in the 1958 off-Broadway The Boy Friend and starred in the 1959 Off-Broadway revival of Lend an Ear. She replaced Electra for her Broadway debut in the original production of Gypsy: A Musical Fable. Squibb appeared in the 1968 Broadway version of The Happy Time. The musical was nominated for the Tony Award for Best Musical. She did modeling work for romance novels and appeared in the 1995 Broadway for Sacrilege. She played Stella Gordon in Dividing the Estate at the Dallas Theater Center and received standout reviews. She played Old Josie in the 2018 Broadway production of Waitress. Squibb was nominated for the Academy Award for Best Supporting Actress and a Golden Globe Award for Best Supporting Actress – Motion Picture, among other accolades for the film Nebraska. She was inducted into the Cleveland Play House Hall of Fame. She starred in the Disney+ film Godmothered. She also played Vivian in the 2021 Apple TV film Palmer. In her role, she was the grandmother of Eddie Palmer which was played by Justin Timberlake.

Filmography

See also
 List of oldest and youngest Academy Award winners and nominees

References

External links
 
 
 

1929 births
20th-century American actresses
20th-century American Jews
21st-century American actresses
21st-century American Jews
Actresses from Illinois
American film actresses
American stage actresses
American television actresses
Converts to Judaism
Disney people
Jewish American actresses
Living people
People from Vandalia, Illinois
Pixar people